Mount Gobey is the highest mountain, at , in the Retreat Hills of Victoria Land, Antarctica, at the south margin of Evans Névé.  This topographical feature was for the first time, climbed on December 26, 1966, by the Northern Party of the New Zealand Geological Survey Antarctic Expedition, 1966–67, who named it for the party's field assistant, D.W. Gobey. The mountain lies situated on the Pennell Coast, a portion of Antarctica lying between Cape Williams and Cape Adare.

References

Mountains of Victoria Land
Mountaineer Range
Pennell Coast